Killing Fields is an album by the American production trio called the Molemen. The album boasts a wide variety of guests from New York City as well as the midwest.

Track listing
 "Intro"
 Performed by DJ Presyce
 Produced by DJ Presyce
 "Street Conflict"
 Performed by Cormega, Hostyle, KL of Screwball
 Produced by Panik
 "Life Sentence"
 Performed by Brother Ali
 Produced by Memo
 "Full Metal Jacket"
 Performed by Kool G. Rap, Mass Hysteria
 Produced by Panik
 "Up To Par"
 Produced by Panik
 "Provin' Em Wrong"
 Performed by Rhymefest
 Produced by Memo
 "Blackhand Clap"
 Performed by Grafh
 Produced by Panik
 "Vague Ultimatum"
 Produced by Memo
 "My Alien Girlfriend"
 Performed by Murs, Slug
 Produced by PNS
 "One Shot, One Kill"
 Performed by Mike Treese
 Produced by Memo
 "2 Hour Banger"
 Performed by Saigon
 Produced by Memo
 "The Come Up"
 Performed by Juice
 Produced by Panik
 "Scarlet Letter"
 Featuring Casual of Hieroglyphics, Del tha Funkee Homosapien, Virtuoso
 Produced by Panik
 "Love Kills War"
 Produced by PNS
 "Redemption"
 Featuring Mikah 9 of Haiku D'Etat
 Produced by PNS
 "QB2BK"
 Featuring Littles, Poison Pen
 Produced by Memo
 "V"
 Performed by Vakill
 Produced by Panik

References

External links
Molemen official site

2005 albums
Molemen albums